The Sam Houston Sanders Corps of Cadets Center is a museum on the campus of Texas A&M University in College Station, Texas, dedicated to the school's Corps of Cadets.

Since its opening in 1992, the Center has become home to thousands of Aggie artifacts, the Metzger-Sanders gun collection, over 60 exhibits, and over 600 photographs. Among the exhibits are those honoring Texas A&M traditions such as the 12th Man, Silver Taps and Muster, as well as some of the Corps of Cadets' most cherished traditions: Aggie Band, Final Review, Fish Drill Team, Parson's Mounted Cavalry and Ross Volunteers.

The Center holds six of the seven Medals of Honor awarded to Texas A&M former students for actions during World War II.

Corps Center Guard
The Corps Center Guard (CGG) is based at the center and is a historical unit that serves to preserve the history of the Corps. They give tours to visiting tourists on a daily basis. As a tribute to the past of A&M, members often wear old uniforms of the Corps.

References

External links
 Sam Houston Sanders Corps of Cadets Center - official site

Texas A&M University
Museums in Brazos County, Texas
Education museums in the United States
University museums in Texas
Museums established in 1992
Military and war museums in Texas